Gyton Stephen Grantley (born 17 July 1980) is an Australian actor and comedian, best known for his portrayal of convicted murderer and drug trafficker Carl Williams in the hit Australian television show Underbelly, for which he was nominated for both Most Outstanding Actor in a Drama Series and Most Popular Actor for the 2009 TV Week Logie Awards and the 2008 AFI award (winning for Most Outstanding Actor in a Drama Series). Grantley won the 2009 Logie Award for Most Outstanding Actor.

Early life
Grantley was educated at the Anglican Church Grammar School in Brisbane, where he graduated in 1997. During his school years, he was a rugby union player and a rower. He was also heavily involved in drama and theatre-sports, and won the Headmaster's Prize for Drama in his senior year. He later attended the Queensland University of Technology.

Career

Television
Grantley began queensland transport - negatives (australia) 2001   his television  acting career in 2001, starring in Fat Cow Motel. Over the next two years, he had small guest roles in Marking Time, Small Claims and The Cooks. In the summer of 2005 / 2006, he had a role in the short lived series headLand. In 2006, he had a small role in Foxtel's Supernova series and in 2007, had a 10-episode guest role in Home and Away.

In 2008, Grantley shot to fame in the high rating drama, Underbelly, where he played antagonist and criminal Carl Williams. With this role he won the 'Most Outstanding Actor' award at the Logies.

In 2009, he starred in 30 Seconds and season two of East West 101.

In 2012, Grantley was cast in a new series, House Husbands, playing the character Kane Albert. In 2015, Grantley left the series after its fourth season, however returned in the fifth-season finale for a brief appearance.

He was announced in late 2013 that he would be reprising his role of Carl Williams in the sequel/spin-off series Fat Tony & Co. which was not placed under the Underbelly franchise (for financing reasons) and focused on the rise and fall of Tony Mokbel, who also featured in the original series, played by Robert Mammone.

In 2017 Gyton took on his first TV presenting role as Host of TEN's Pooches at Play, a lifestyle show all about dogs and our relationship with them. In 2018 he is performing in the theatrical production Hand to God and continues his hosting role on Pooches at Play.

Appearances
 Informer 3838 as Carl Williams (2020)
 Date Night (narrator) (2018)
 Fat Tony & Co. as Carl Williams (2014)
 House Husbands as Kane Albert (2012-2015)
 Out of the Blue as Alex (2008)
 Underbelly as Carl Williams (2008)
 Supernova as Jeff (2006)
 Home and Away as James Dalton (2007)
 headLand as Dane Pickerstaff (2005)
 The Cooks as Joe (2004-2005)
 Small Claims as Det Snr Const Brett Michaels (2004-2006)
 Marking Time as Shane Sheather (2003)
  Fat Cow Motel as Gary Walpole (2003)

Film
He appeared in two short film entries for the 2009 Tropfest Short Film Festival, including Being Carl Williams where Grantley, playing himself, is abducted by two criminals who mistake him for Carl Williams after his role in Underbelly.

Films
 Don't Tell as Kevin Guy (2017)
 The Dressmaker as Barney McSwiney (2015)
 Beneath Hill 60 as Norman Morris (2010 Anzac Day release)
 The Reef  as Matt (2010)
 Prime Mover as Repo Man #1 (2009)
 Being Carl Williams as himself (2009)
 Balibo as Gary Cunningham (2009)
 All My Friends Are Leaving Brisbane as Jake (2007)
 A Man's Gotta Do as Dominic (2004)
 Under the Radar as Trent (2004)
 Danny Deckchair as Stuey (2003)
 Swimming Upstream (2003)
 Blurred as Gavin (2002)

Theatre
He appeared as Ron Weasley in the Australian production, in Melbourne, of Harry Potter and the Cursed Child.

Personal life
Grantley is actively involved with the Australian organisation, Polished Man, which helps support and raise awareness for children affected by violence.

References

External links
 

1980 births
21st-century Australian male actors
AACTA Award winners
Australian male film actors
Australian male television actors
Living people
Logie Award winners
People educated at Anglican Church Grammar School
Queensland University of Technology alumni